Dellach is a municipality in the district of Hermagor, in the Austrian state of Carinthia.

Geography

The municipal area lies in the upper Gail valley, between the neighbouring municipalities of Kötschach-Mauthen in the west and Kirchbach in the east. The Carnic Alps in the south form the border with Paularo in Italy.

History
Archaeological findings in the hamlet of Gurina denote a settlement since the age of the Hallstatt culture, when the local Celtic population ran copper smelting facilities to coin mints. It became one of the first Roman cities in present-day Austria, when the area was part of the Noricum province.

The village of Doelach itself was first mentioned in a 1370 deed; the name was possibly derived from Slavic dolina: "valley". A church in nearby Sankt Daniel existed since Carolingian times. For a long time, the estates were held by the Counts of Gorizia, until they fell to the Austrian House of Habsburg. The present-day municipality was established in 1850.

Politics
Seats in the municipal council (Gemeinderat) as of 2015 elections:
Austrian People's Party (ÖVP): 8
Freedom Party of Austria (FPÖ): 4
Social Democratic Party of Austria (SPÖ): 3

External links

Municipal site

References 

Cities and towns in Hermagor District
Gailtal Alps